A piaya (Hiligaynon: piyaya, ; Spanish: piaya) is a muscovado-filled unleavened flatbread from the Philippines especially common in Negros Occidental where it is a popular delicacy. It is made by filling dough with a mixture of muscovado and water. The filled dough is then flattened with a rolling pin, sprinkled with sesame seeds and baked on a griddle. Piaya is best eaten warm.

Variations
The traditional sweet filling made of muscovado has other alternatives, including ube and mango. A piayito (Hiligaynon: piyayito) is a tiny version of the piaya and is thin and crispy.

See also
 Bakpia

 Bánh pía
 Mooncake

References

Philippine pastries
Culture of Negros Occidental
Visayan cuisine